The 13th Cook Islands Parliament is the previous term of the Parliament of the Cook Islands. Its composition was determined by the 2010 elections on 17 November 2010.

Due to an electoral petition declaring the election of Tekii Lazaro invalid, the 13th Parliament initially consisted of only 23 members.  A by-election was held for the vacant Pukapuka-Nassau seat.

The Parliament sat for the first time on 18 February 2011. It was dissolved on 17 April 2014.

The Speaker of the 13th Parliament was initially former Prime Minister Geoffrey Henry.  Following Henry's death in May 2012, Niki Rattle was appointed Speaker.

Members

Initial MPs

New members

Summary of changes
 On 8 March 2011 Norman George resigned from the Cook Islands Party and became an independent.
 Tekii Lazaro was elected to the seat of Pukapuka on 8 June 2011 following the byelection.
 Robert Wigmore died on 13 April 2012.
 Selina Napa was elected to the seat of Titikaveka on 21 June 2012 following the 2012 Titikaveka by-election.
 Tetangi Matapo was elected to the seat of Tamarua on 29 January 2013 following the 2013 Tamarua by-election.
 Tom Marsters resigned from Parliament on 25 September 2013 following his appointment as Queen's Representative. He was eventually replaced by James Beer after the 2014 Murienua by-election.

References

External links
 Members of the Parliament of the Cook Islands

Politics of the Cook Islands
2010 in the Cook Islands